Reynoldscroft is a community in the Canadian province of Nova Scotia, located in the Barrington Municipal District of Shelburne County.

See also
 List of communities in Nova Scotia

References

External links
Reynoldscroft on Destination Nova Scotia

Communities in Shelburne County, Nova Scotia
General Service Areas in Nova Scotia
Populated coastal places in Canada